Hans von Boineburg-Lengsfeld (9 June 1889 – 20 November 1980) was a German general in the Wehrmacht of Nazi Germany who commanded the 4th and 23rd Panzer Divisions during World War II. He was also a recipient of the Knight's Cross of the Iron Cross of Nazi Germany.

Biography
Born in Thuringia, Boineburg-Lengsfeld joined the army of Imperial Germany as an Fahnen-junker (officer cadet) in 1910. He was commissioned in the light infantry and fought in World War I. In the interwar period, he served in the Reichsheer and then the Wehrmacht. He led the 1st Rifle Regiment from 1938 to 1939 before being given command of the 4th Schützen (Rifle) Brigade of the 4th Panzer Division which fought in the Invasion of Poland. He temporarily commanded the division for a few days in May 1940, during the campaign in Holland, and was awarded the Knight's Cross of the Iron Cross on 19 July 1940. Now an oberst (colonel), a more substantive period in command of the 4th Panzer Division followed from late July to September 1940. He was then transferred to the 7th Panzer Division, serving occupation duty in France and then in Russia during Operation Barbarossa, as commander of its 7th Schützen Brigade.

When the 23rd Panzer Division was formed in September 1941, Boineburg-Lengsfeld was appointed its commander. He was promoted to generalmajor shortly afterwards. He led the division during the Battle of the Caucasus but was relieved of command during the "Reichel Case", when plans for Case Blue, the codename for the Wehrmachts summer offensive in Southern Russia, were lost to the Soviets. However, when his successor as commander, Generalmajor Erwin Mack, was killed in action, he returned as the division's permanent leader. In late December 1942, having received a promotion to generalleutnant a few weeks earlier, he was injured as a result of an accident with a tank. With several broken bones, he underwent an extended period in hospital.

After recovering from his injuries, Boineburg-Lengsfeld was made the commandant of greater Paris. When that city was captured by the Allies in August 1944, he took a post at OB West. His participation in the 20 July plot to assassinate Adolf Hitler went undetected and he ended the war at Bergen, as its area commander. He died on 20 November 1980 in Felsberg.

NotesFootnotesCitations'

References

1889 births
1980 deaths
People from Eisenach
Lieutenant generals of the German Army (Wehrmacht)
German Army personnel of World War I
People from Saxe-Weimar-Eisenach
Recipients of the clasp to the Iron Cross, 1st class
Recipients of the Knight's Cross of the Iron Cross
German prisoners of war in World War II held by the United States
Barons of Germany
Military personnel from Thuringia
German Army generals of World War II